Kyrgyzstan competed at the 2004 Summer Olympics in Athens, Greece, from 13 to 29 August 2004. This was the nation's third appearance at the Olympics in the post-Soviet era.

The National Olympic Committee of the Republic of Kyrgyzstan sent the nation's smallest delegation to the Games. A total of 29 athletes, 22 men and 7 women, competed only in 9 sports. Eight Kyrgyzstani athletes had previously competed in Sydney, including 43-year-old marathon runner Irina Bogachova, Greco-Roman wrestler Gennady Chkhaidze, who finished fifth for his native country Georgia in the men's heavyweight division, and Asian Games silver medalist Evgeny Vakker in men's road cycling. Freestyle swimmer Ruslan Ismailov, aged 14, set the nation's Olympic milestone as the youngest ever athlete to compete at the Olympics. Weightlifter and 2000 Olympian Mital Sharipov was the nation's flag bearer in the opening ceremony.

For the second time in history, Kyrgyzstan failed to win a single Olympic medal in Athens.

Athletics

Kyrgyzstani athletes have so far achieved qualifying standards in the following athletics events (up to a maximum of 3 athletes in each event at the 'A' Standard, and 1 at the 'B' Standard).

Key
 Note–Ranks given for track events are within the athlete's heat only
 Q = Qualified for the next round
 q = Qualified for the next round as a fastest loser or, in field events, by position without achieving the qualifying target
 NR = National record
 N/A = Round not applicable for the event
 Bye = Athlete not required to compete in round

Men
Track & road events

Women
Track & road events

Field events

Boxing

Kyrgyzstan sent only two boxers to Athens.

Cycling

Road

Judo

Kyrgyzstan has qualified a single judoka.

Modern pentathlon

Two Kyrygzstani athletes qualified to compete in the modern pentathlon event through the Asian Championships.

Shooting 

Kyrgyzstan has qualified a single shooter.

Men

Swimming

Kyrgyzstani swimmers earned qualifying standards in the following events (up to a maximum of 2 swimmers in each event at the A-standard time, and 1 at the B-standard time):

Men

Weightlifting

Kyrgyzstan has qualified one weightlifter.

Wrestling 

Key
  - Victory by Fall.
  - Decision by Points - the loser with technical points.
  - Decision by Points - the loser without technical points.

Men's freestyle

Men's Greco-Roman

See also
 Kyrgyzstan at the 2002 Asian Games
 Kyrgyzstan at the 2004 Summer Paralympics

References

External links
Official Report of the XXVIII Olympiad

Nations at the 2004 Summer Olympics
2004
2004 in Kyrgyzstani sport